Donald Fitzherbert Campbell (23 August 1886 – 24 September 1933) was an Anglican priest in the late nineteenth and early twentieth centuries.

Campbell was educated at Charterhouse and New College, Oxford and ordained in 1910. After curacies in Liverpool and Hove he was Vicar of Vicar of Carlton Hill, Portslade and Preston.

He succeeded his father as Archdeacon of Carlisle in 1930 but was killed in a motor accident three years later.

Notes

 

1886 births
1930 deaths
People educated at Charterhouse School
Alumni of New College, Oxford
Archdeacons of Carlisle